Tatjana Veinberga (September 4, 1943 – April 3, 2008), also known as Tatyana, is a former Latvian volleyball player for the Soviet Union. She was a member of the Soviet squad that won a gold medal in women's volleyball at the 1968 Summer Olympics in Mexico City, but she did not actually take part in any of the team's matches. To this day she remains as the first and only Latvian Olympic volleyball champion in history.

Veinberga played in the Soviet national team from 1967 to 1969, as well as represented the Latvian teams LVU, "Elektrons" and "Daugava" from 1961 til 1969.

References

External links
 
 
 

1943 births
2008 deaths
Sportspeople from Riga
Olympic volleyball players of the Soviet Union
Volleyball players at the 1968 Summer Olympics
Olympic gold medalists for the Soviet Union
Soviet women's volleyball players
Latvian women's volleyball players
Olympic medalists in volleyball
Medalists at the 1968 Summer Olympics